Marika Šoposká (born 12 November 1989 in Havlíčkův Brod) is a Czech actress.

Selected filmography

Films 
 Bába (2008)
 Flower Buds (2011)
 Lidice (2011)
 Jan Hus (2015)
 I, Olga Hepnarová (2016)
 The Play (2019)

TV series 
 Josephine, Guardian Angel (2007)
 Cirkus Bukowsky (2013) 
 První republika (2014)  
 Ordinace v růžové zahradě (2017)

References

External links
 

 

1989 births
Living people
People from Havlíčkův Brod
Czech film actresses
21st-century Czech actresses
Czech stage actresses
Czech television actresses
Prague Conservatory alumni
Czech voice actresses